Prosthetic Records is an American record label specializing in heavy metal recordings, founded in Los Angeles, California in 1998 by E.J. Johantgen and Dan Fitzgerald. Prosthetic Records released the first two albums by Lamb of God and Animals as Leaders and was the North American home to Gojira and are currently home to .gif from god, Dawn Ray'd, Thotcrime, Vile Creature, Psycroptic, Four Stroke Baron and many more artists.

Artists

Current
.gif from god
ACxDC
Amygdala
An Autumn For Crippled Children
Ashbringer
Astralborne
The Atlas Moth
Battle Born
Bereft
Bismuth
Blindfolded And Led To The Woods
Calligram
Cassus
Cognizance
Dawn Ray’d
Depths of Hatred
The Ditch & The Delta
Dryad
Exist
Fires in the Distance
Fool's Ghost
Foretoken
Four Stroke Baron
Funeral Chic
Gama Bomb
Horndal
Huntsmen
Infera Bruo
Jason Kui
Judicator
Junius
Kenosis
Languish
Leeched
Loviatar
The Machinist
Marty Friedman
meth.
Micawber
Monotheist
Neckbeard Deathcamp
Nekroí Theoí 
Nekrasov
North
Paladin
Phobophilic
Psycroptic
Pupil Slicer
Reaping Asmodeia
Rebel Wizard
Sarin
Schammasch
Sermon
Sorxe
Snowburial
Summoning the Lich
SVNEATR
Tempel
Thotcrime
Tripsitter
Undeath
Varaha
Venom Prison
Vile Creature
Werewolves
Wildspeaker
Without Waves
Wolf King
Wormwitch
Wristmeetrazor
WVRM
WuW
Zaius

Former

1349
The Acacia Strain
All Hell
All That Remains
Ancient VVisdom
Antagonist
Animals as Leaders
Beneath the Massacre
Burn in Silence
Black September
Black Trip
Book of Black Earth
Byzantine
Cannae
Castle
Century
Clinging to the Trees of a Forest Fire
Crematorium
Dew-Scented
Dragged into Sunlight
Everything Went Black
Exmortus
Felix Martin
Gojira
Grief of War
The Hell
Himsa
Hollow Corp
Holy Grail
Hour of Penance
Howling Sycamore
Infernaeon
Invocation Of Nehek
Kylesa
Landmine Marathon
Lamb of God
Last Chance to Reason
Light This City
Muck
Mutilation Rites
Negator
Nero di Marte
Reflux
Septicflesh
Set and Setting
Scale the Summit
So Hideous
Spellcaster
Spirit Adrift
Skeletonwitch
Testament
The Esoteric
The Funeral Pyre
The Minor Times
Through the Eyes of the Dead
Trap Them
Unholy
Wayfarer
White Arms of Athena
Withered
Wolf
Wolves Like Us
Yakuza
Year of Desolation
Yüth Forever
Zodiac

See also
List of record labels

References

External links
Official website
Prosthetic Records at MySpace

American independent record labels
Death metal record labels
Hardcore record labels
Heavy metal record labels
Thrash metal record labels
Record labels established in 1998